Matt Greenwood (born 27 February 1995) is an English actor best known for portraying Tom Clarke in the BBC drama series The A Word and Martin Dunbar in Waterloo Road. He has also appeared in Casualty, Bohemian Rhapsody, and Giri/Haji.

Life and career
Greenwood was born in Manchester, England on 27 February 1995. He began acting age 6, starting at the Helen O'Grady Children's Drama Academy, where he trained until the age of 10. It was then from ages 10 to 16 that he trained at the Carol Godby Theatre Workshop. During this time, he began working professionally as an actor, starting with the BBC's prime-time drama series Waterloo Road as transgender pupil Martin Dunbar. Greenwood then went on to train at The Manchester College - Shena Simon Campus, the National Youth Theatre of Great Britain, and the Manchester School of Acting, while continuing to act professionally alongside his studies.

His further credits include the role of Mark Davies in the BBC long-running medical drama series Casualty and series regular Tom Clarke in the BBC drama series The A Word. Greenwood can also be seen in the 20th Century Fox biopic Bohemian Rhapsody and in Giri/Haji, a 2019 TV series broadcast on BBC Two in the UK and streamed on Netflix worldwide. He has also worked extensively in theatre, both in his native Manchester and in London.

In 2019, Greenwood played the title character in the play Call Me Vicky for its debut run at The Pleasance Theatre, London in February and March as part of the theatre's #YouWillKnowTheirNames season, with veteran British actress Wendi Peters playing Vicky's mother, Sylvie. He received high praise from theatre critics for his performance and was nominated for the 2019 Best Male Performance category at The Off West End Theatre Awards.

In February 2022 it was announced that Greenwood would reprise his role from The A Word in a new spin-off series titled Ralph & Katie. Filming commenced in February in Manchester and the Lake District, the show's setting.

Selected filmography

Film

Television

References

External links
 

1995 births
Living people
British male television actors
British male film actors
British male stage actors